Cocaine Annie is the final studio album by American bluesman Gary B.B. Coleman. To record this release in 1993, he left Ichiban Records with which he had spent his previous five years and issued Cocaine Annie on his own imprint called Boola Boo. Later in 1994, the album was re-released by Icehouse Records. The album includes two covers by Albert King: "Personal Manager" and "Answer to the Laundromat Blues". The album was released on CD on January 13, 2010.

Track listing

Personnel
Gary B.B. Coleman – vocals, lead guitar, rhythm guitar, piano, organ
Steve Kilmer – bass
Trenton Dick – keyboards

References

1994 albums
Gary B. B. Coleman albums